Kaveri–Vaigai Link Canal Project is a project envisioned by Government of Tamil Nadu, linking Kaveri and Vaigai rivers.

Background

Tamil Nadu is one of the states in southern India which depends heavily on the rivers flowing from the neighboring states of Kerala and Karnataka. Hence, the state government started this project linking Kaveri and Vaigai rivers which would benefit during the drier seasons.

About the project 
On 24 June 2008, Chief Minister of Tamil Nadu, M.Karunanidhi laid the foundation for the construction of barrage. The link canal will run through the districts of Karur, Trichy, Pudukkottai, Sivaganga, Ramanathapuram and Virudhunagar. According to  the National Water Development agency, the gravity canal will provide water for irrigating additional area of 3.38 lakh hectares and for domestic and industrial water supply.

References 

Kaveri River
Rivers of Tamil Nadu
Canals in Tamil Nadu
Rivers of India